The Amakula International Film Festival is an annual film festival that takes place in Uganda founded in 2004.It is Uganda's oldest film festival founded by Dutch film historian Alice Smits and American filmmaker Lee Elickson.

History
The first Amakula Kampala International Film Festival was inaugurated on May 21, 2004. The festival features Programme
The screening programme will be divided into selections that can be defined as:
Contemporary Cinema A survey of current films from around the world

The festival consists of competition, discussions, workshops and seminar and other multi-disciplinary performances

Setback
The festival received a major setback in 2012 which according to some sources was because of financial reasons but it resumed on 16 March 2016 under a new management, moving from Amakula Cultural Foundation to now being presented by Bayimba Cultural Foundation.

References 

Film festivals in Uganda
African film festivals